Laleshwar Kumar Narayan Singh (born 2 April 1941) was from 1993 to 2015 High Commissioner from the Co-operative Republic of Guyana to the United Kingdom, as well as the non-resident ambassador in five other countries.

After studying law in Guyana, and training as a court clerk, he moved to work in the United Kingdom in 1961. From 1971 to 1993 he worked for the Magistrates' Courts Service in central London. In 1993 he was appointed the High Commissioner (Commonwealth) for Guyana in London, as well as the (non-resident) ambassador to the Netherlands. He has since been appointed non-resident ambassador to France and the Russian Federation (1995), the Czech Republic (1997) and the Holy See (1998).

In 2018, Hamley Case replaced Singh as the new high commissioner and non-resident ambassador for various European countries.

See Also 

 List of Guyanese High Commissioners to the United Kingdom
 Guyana–Russia relations

References

1941 births
Living people
Ambassadors of Guyana to the Netherlands
Ambassadors of Guyana to France
Ambassadors of Guyana to the Czech Republic
Ambassadors of Guyana to the Holy See
Ambassadors of Guyana to Russia
High Commissioners of Guyana to the United Kingdom